Nino Crisman (1911–1983) was an Italian actor and film producer. Crisman was born in the port city of Trieste when it was still a part of the Austro-Hungarian Empire. Crisman made his film debut in 1939 during the Fascist era. He appeared as an actor in over thirty films, such as El Greco (1966). From 1959 onwards he also began to produce films. He was married to the actress Rossana Martini.

Selected filmography

Actor
 Dora Nelson (1939)
 Backstage (1939)
 Department Store (1939)
 The Siege of the Alcazar (1940)
 Caravaggio (1941)
 Malombra (1942)
 I Live as I Please (1942)
 Two Hearts (1943)
 Macario Against Zagomar (1944)
 Turri il bandito (1950)
 I'm the Capataz (1951)
 Angela (1955)
 Burning Fuse (1957)
 The Black Devil (1957)
 La vita agra (1964)
 The Dirty Game (1965)
 El Greco (1966)

Producer
 Liolà (1963)
 La vita agra (1964)
 Roma Bene (1971)

References

Bibliography
 Klossner, Michael. The Europe of 1500-1815 on Film and Television. McFarland & Co., 2002.

External links

1911 births
1983 deaths
Italian film producers
Italian male film actors
Mass media people from Trieste
20th-century Italian male actors
Actors from Trieste